NVLink is a wire-based serial multi-lane near-range communications link developed by Nvidia. Unlike PCI Express, a device can consist of multiple NVLinks, and devices use mesh networking to communicate instead of a central hub. The protocol was first announced in March 2014 and uses a proprietary high-speed signaling interconnect (NVHS).

Principle 
NVLink is a wire-based communications protocol for near-range semiconductor communications developed by Nvidia that can be used for data and control code transfers in processor systems between CPUs and GPUs and solely between GPUs. NVLink specifies a point-to-point connection with data rates of 20, 25 and 50 Gbit/s (v1.0/v2.0/v3.0 resp.) per differential pair. Eight differential pairs form a "sub-link" and two "sub-links", one for each direction, form a "link". The total data rate for a sub-link is 25 GByte/s and the total data rate for a link is 50 GByte/s. Each V100 GPU supports up to six links. Thus, each GPU is capable of supporting up to 300 GByte/s in total bi-directional bandwidth. NVLink products introduced to date focus on the high-performance application space. Announced May 14, 2020, NVLink 3.0 increases the data rate per differential pair from 25 Gbit/s to 50 Gbit/s while halving the number of pairs per NVLink from 8 to 4. With 12 links for an Ampere-based A100 GPU this brings the total bandwidth to 600 GB/sec. Hopper has 18 NVLink 4.0 links enabling a total of 900 GB/sec bandwidth.

Performance 
The following table shows a basic metrics comparison based upon standard specifications:

The following table shows a comparison of relevant bus parameters for real world semiconductors that all offer NVLink as one of their options:

Note: Data rate columns were rounded by being approximated by transmission rate, see real world performance paragraph
Ⓐ: sample value; NVLink sub-link bundling should be possible
Ⓑ: sample value; other fractions for the PCIe lane usage should be possible
Ⓒ: a single (no! 16) PCIe lane transfers data over a differential pair
Ⓓ: various limitations of finally possible combinations might apply due to chip pin muxing and board design
dual: interface unit can either be configured as a root hub or an end point
generic: bare semiconductor without any board design specific restrictions applied

Real world performance could be determined by applying different encapsulation taxes as well usage rate. Those come from various sources:
 128b/130b line code (see e.g. PCI Express data transmission for versions 3.0 and higher)
 Link control characters
 Transaction header
 Buffering capabilities (depends on device)
 DMA usage on computer side (depends on other software, usually negligible on benchmarks)
Those physical limitations usually reduce the data rate to between 90 and 95% of the transfer rate. NVLink benchmarks show an achievable transfer rate of about 35.3 Gbit/s (host to device) for a 40 Gbit/s (2 sub-lanes uplink) NVLink connection towards a P100 GPU in a system that is driven by a set of IBM Power8 CPUs.

Usage with plug-in boards 
For the various versions of plug-in boards (a yet small number of high-end gaming and professional graphics GPU boards with this feature exist) that expose extra connectors for joining them into a NVLink group, a similar number of slightly varying, relatively compact, PCB based interconnection plugs does exist. Typically only boards of the same type will mate together due to their physical and logical design. For some setups two identical plugs need to be applied for achieving the full data rate. As of now the typical plug is U-shaped with a fine grid edge connector on each of the end strokes of the shape facing away from the viewer. The width of the plug determines how far away the plug-in cards need to be seated to the main board of the hosting computer system - a distance for the placement of the card is commonly determined by the matching plug (known available plug widths are 3 to 5 slots and also depend on board type). The interconnect is often referred as Scalable Link Interface (SLI) from 2004 for its structural design and appearance, even if the modern NVLink based design is of a quite different technical nature with different features in its basic levels compared to the former design. Reported real world devices are:
 Quadro GP100 (a pair of cards will make use of up to 2 bridges; the setup realizes either 2 or 4 NVLink connections with up to 160 GB/s - this might resemble NVLink 1.0 with 20 GT/s)
 Quadro GV100 (a pair of cards will need up to 2 bridges and realize up to 200 GB/s - this might resemble NVLink 2.0 with 25 GT/s and 4 links)

 GeForce RTX 2080 based on TU104 (with single bridge "GeForce RTX NVLink-Bridge")
 GeForce RTX 2080 Ti based on TU102 (with single bridge "GeForce RTX NVLink-Bridge")
 Quadro RTX 5000 based on TU104 (with single bridge "NVLink" up to 50 GB/s - this might resemble NVLink 2.0 with 25 GT/s and 1 link)
 Quadro RTX 6000 based on TU102 (with single bridge "NVLink HB" up to 100 GB/s - this might resemble NVLink 2.0 with 25 GT/s and 2 links)
 Quadro RTX 8000 based on TU102 (with single bridge "NVLink HB" up to 100 GB/s - this might resemble NVLink 2.0 with 25 GT/s and 2 links)

Service software and programming 
For the Tesla, Quadro and Grid product lines, the NVML-API (Nvidia Management Library API) offers a set of functions for programmatically controlling some aspects of NVLink interconnects on Windows and Linux systems, such as component evaluation and versions along with status/error querying and performance monitoring. Further, with the provision of the NCCL library (Nvidia Collective Communications Library) developers in the public space shall be enabled for realizing e.g. powerful implementations for artificial intelligence and similar computation hungry topics atop NVLink. The page "3D Settings" » "Configure SLI, Surround, PhysX" in the Nvidia Control panel and the CUDA sample application "simpleP2P" use such APIs to realize their services in respect to their NVLink features. On the Linux platform, the command line application with sub-command "nvidia-smi nvlink" provides a similar set of advanced information and control.

History 
On 5 April 2016, Nvidia announced that NVLink would be implemented in the Pascal-microarchitecture-based GP100 GPU, as used in, for example, Nvidia Tesla P100 products. With the introduction of the DGX-1 high performance computer base it was possible to have up to eight P100 modules in a single rack system connected to up to two host CPUs. The carrier board (...) allows for a dedicated board for routing the NVLink connections – each P100 requires 800 pins, 400 for PCIe + power, and another 400 for the NVLinks, adding up to nearly 1600 board traces for NVLinks alone (...). Each CPU has direct connection to 4 units of P100 via PCIe and each P100 has one NVLink each to the 3 other P100s in the same CPU group plus one more NVLink to one P100 in the other CPU group. Each NVLink (link interface) offers a bidirectional 20 GB/sec up 20 GB/sec down, with 4 links per GP100 GPU, for an aggregate bandwidth of 80 GB/sec up and another 80 GB/sec down. NVLink supports routing so that in the DGX-1 design for every P100 a total of 4 of the other 7 P100s are directly reachable and the remaining 3 are reachable with only one hop. According to depictions in Nvidia's blog-based publications, from 2014 NVLink allows bundling of individual links for increased point to point performance so that for example a design with two P100s and all links established between the two units would allow the full NVLink bandwidth of 80 GB/s between them.

At GTC2017, Nvidia presented its Volta generation of GPUs and indicated the integration of a revised version 2.0 of NVLink that would allow total I/O data rates of 300 GB/s for a single chip for this design, and further announced the option for pre-orders with a delivery promise for Q3/2017 of the DGX-1 and DGX-Station high performance computers that will be equipped with GPU modules of type V100 and have NVLink 2.0 realized in either a networked (two groups of four V100 modules with inter-group connectivity) or a fully interconnected fashion of one group of four V100 modules.

In 2017-2018, IBM and Nvidia delivered the Summit and Sierra supercomputers for the US Department of Energy which combine IBM's POWER9 family of CPUs and Nvidia's Volta architecture, using NVLink 2.0 for the CPU-GPU and GPU-GPU interconnects and InfiniBand EDR for the system interconnects.

In 2020, Nvidia announced that they will no longer be adding new SLI driver profiles on RTX 2000 series and older from January 1, 2021.

See also 
 Intel QuickPath Interconnect
 HyperTransport
 Message Passing Interface
 INK (operating system)
 Compute Node Linux
 Intel Xe Link

References 

Nvidia
Computer buses
Serial buses